James Michael Sadowski (born August 7, 1951 in Pittsburgh, Pennsylvania) is a former relief pitcher in Major League Baseball who played briefly for the Pittsburgh Pirates in their 1974 season. Listed at 6' 3", 195 lb, Sadowski batted and threw right-handed. Coming out of a baseball family, he is the nephew of former big leaguers Bob, Ed and Ted Sadowski.

In one-season career, Sadowski posted a 0-1 record and a 6.00 ERA in four relief appearances.

Sadowski also pitched for the Pirates, Kansas City Royals and Cincinnati Reds Minor League systems in parts of 10 seasons spanning 1969–1979. He went 58-72 with a 3.92 ERA in 248 games (131 starts), walking 617 hitters while striking out 768 in 1,057 innings of work.

Besides, Sadowski played winter baseball with the Navegantes del Magallanes and Leones del Caracas clubs of the Venezuelan League during the 1974–1977 seasons.

External links

The Baseball Gauge
Retrosheet
Pura Pelota : VPBL pitching statistics
Hefren-Tillotson Pittsburgh Branch

1951 births
Living people
Baseball players from Pittsburgh
Charleston Charlies players
Columbus Clippers players
Florida Instructional League Pirates players
Gastonia Pirates players
Gulf Coast Pirates players
Jacksonville Suns players
Leones del Caracas players
Major League Baseball pitchers
Navegantes del Magallanes players
American expatriate baseball players in Venezuela
Omaha Royals players
Pittsburgh Pirates players
Salem Pirates players
Salem Rebels players
Sherbrooke Pirates players
Shreveport Captains players
Waterbury Pirates players